Christian Jeanpierre (also spelt Jean-Pierre, born 9 April 1965) is a French sports journalist who has worked for French television channels Canal+ and TF1, as well as radio station Europe 1. Jeanpierre presented TF1's football programme, Téléfoot, in 2004, and from 2008 to 2018.

Personal life
Jeanpierre was born in Le Puy-en-Velay, Haute-Loire, and grew up in Toulouse. His grandparents were farmers. He studied at the Journalists Training Center in Montpellier. Jeanpierre is a supporter of Toulouse FC, and rugby union team Stade Toulousain. He is an amateur drummer, and plays music with Jean-Jacques Goldman.

Career
Jeanpierre's first journalistic work was for the La Dépêche du Midi whilst he was providing humanitarian aid in Mali. In 1987, he began working for the magazine ça m'intéresse. In 1988, he began working for broadcaster TF1 as an intern. At TF1, he then became a reporter, and then a columnist. Jeanpierre covered the Rugby World Cups between 1995 and 2019. Jeanpierre is nicknamed "Monsieur foot" ("Mr Football").

Between 2003 and 2008, Jeanpierre worked for French radio station Europe 1 in their sports department. He specialised in football commentary. After Thierry Roland's departure from TF1 football programme Téléfoot in 2004, Jeanpierre hosted the show alongside . In January 2005, they were replaced by Thierry Gilardi. After the death of Gilardi in 2008, Christian Jeanpierre returned as Téléfoot presenter. His first programme was dedicated to Gilardi. He covered every France international football game between 2008 and early 2016, and is remembered for his commentary of France's defeat to hosts South Africa at the 2010 FIFA World Cup. Grégoire Margotton was chosen ahead of Jeanpierre to present Téléfoot's coverage of France matches at UEFA Euro 2016, after Margotton moved from Canal+ to TF1. Jeanpierre had presented Téléfoot's coverage of the 2008 and 2012 tournaments, and continued to cover other matches at Euro 2016, alongside former A.S. Roma coach Rudi Garcia.
He commentated on seven matches, including England against Slovakia, and also interviewed French manager Didier Deschamps two days after France's first match of the tournament against Romania. After the 2018 FIFA World Cup, Jeanpierre was replaced by Margotton as the main presenter of Téléfoot. Jeanpierre was then demoted to only covering minor matches. He left TF1 in 2020; his last broadcast was Les Enfoirés, les secrets de une concert on 14 March. He later worked on high frequency microphones used by FIFA and UEFA. In 2021, he was working with Canal+ on a programme about The Invincibles Arsenal team.

Works
In 2021, Jeanpierre wrote a novel 2026, l'année où le football deviendra américain (2026, the year when football becomes America).

 Jeanpierre, Christian, Quarante-Huit Deux-Tiers (48 and two-thirds), 2015  (in French)
 Hourcade, Bertrand, Jeanpierre, Christian, Sorry, good game ! : Le dico bilingue du rugby, La Maison du Dictionnaire, 2019  (dual language English and French)
 Jeanpierre, Christian, 2026, l'année où le football deviendra américain (2026, the year when football becomes America), Solar, 2021,

References

French sports journalists
1965 births
Living people
Sportspeople from Haute-Loire
French television presenters
21st-century French writers